László Bodnár (born 25 February 1979) is a Hungarian former professional football who played as a right back for clubs in Hungary, Ukraine, the Netherlands and Austria. He made 45 appearances for the Hungary national team.

Personal life
Bodnár was born in Mátészalka. On 28 August 2009, he caused a fatal road accident which killing a cyclist. He was found guilty for speeding and was given a one-year prison sentence which was suspended for a one-year probation. He was also to pay a €1000 fine.

Career statistics

Club

International

Honours
Dynamo Kiev
 Premier League: 2001, 2003; runner-up: 2002
 Ukrainian Cup: 2003; runner-up: 2002
 CIS Cup: 2002

Red Bull Salzburg
 Austrian Bundesliga: 2007, 2009; runner-up: 2008

Debreceni VSC
 Hungarian National Championship I: 2009–10
 Hungarian Cup: 2009–10
 Hungarian League Cup: 2010
 Hungarian Super Cup: 2010

References

External links

 
 

1979 births
Living people
People from Mátészalka
Hungarian criminals
Hungarian footballers
Hungary international footballers
Association football defenders
Debreceni VSC players
FC Dynamo Kyiv players
FC Dynamo-2 Kyiv players
FC Dynamo-3 Kyiv players
FC Arsenal Kyiv players
Roda JC Kerkrade players
FC Red Bull Salzburg players
Pécsi MFC players
Ukrainian Premier League players
Ukrainian First League players
Ukrainian Second League players
Eredivisie players
Austrian Football Bundesliga players
Hungarian expatriate footballers
Expatriate footballers in Ukraine
Expatriate footballers in the Netherlands
Expatriate footballers in Austria
Hungarian expatriate sportspeople in Ukraine
Hungarian expatriate sportspeople in the Netherlands
Hungarian expatriate sportspeople in Austria
Sportspeople convicted of crimes
Hungary under-21 international footballers
Hungary youth international footballers
Sportspeople from Szabolcs-Szatmár-Bereg County